Alfredo Massazza (24 May 1943 – 17 March 2004) was an Italian archer. He competed in the men's individual event at the 1972 Summer Olympics.

References

External links
 

1943 births
2004 deaths
Italian male archers
Olympic archers of Italy
Archers at the 1972 Summer Olympics
Sportspeople from the Province of Pavia
20th-century Italian people
People from Stradella